Carlos Rodolfo Rojas Rojas (born 2 October 1928, date of death unknown) was a Chilean football midfielder who played for Chile in the 1950 FIFA World Cup. He also played for Unión Española. Rojas is deceased.

References

External links
FIFA profile

1928 births
Year of death missing
Chilean footballers
Chile international footballers
Association football midfielders
Unión Española footballers
1950 FIFA World Cup players